Fort Scott is a city in and the county seat of Bourbon County, Kansas, United States. As of the 2020 census, the population of the city was 7,552. It is named for Gen. Winfield Scott. It is the home of the Fort Scott National Historic Site and the Fort Scott National Cemetery.

History

Established and garrisoned by the U.S. Army from 1842–1853, soldiers at military Fort Scott assisted with the protection of the Permanent Indian Frontier. After the army abandoned the fort in 1853, the buildings were purchased by local settlers at a government auction in 1855. The community of Fort Scott was laid out in 1857, and was chartered as a city in 1860.

Between 1855 and 1861, the citizens of Fort Scott experienced the violent unrest that preceded the American Civil War on the Kansas and Missouri border. Eastern newspapers described this violence as "Bleeding Kansas", a result of the national controversy concerning the extension of slavery into the new territories. On January 29, 1861, Kansas entered the union as a free state, but the turmoil of "Bleeding Kansas" continued throughout the Civil War.

During the Civil War, Fort Scott was a U.S Army district Headquarters, quartermaster supply depot, training center, and recruitment station. It was strategically vital to the defense of Kansas and the Midwest. A battle over the fort occurred in August 1861 just across the Missouri line in the Battle of Dry Wood Creek. The battle was a pro-South victory for Sterling Price and his Missouri State Guard.  Price did not hold the fort and instead continued a northern push into Missouri in an attempt to recapture the state. James H. Lane (Senator) was to launch a Jayhawker offensive behind Price from Fort Scott that led to the Sacking of Osceola.  The ill will of these actions was to be the basis for the 1976 Clint Eastwood film The Outlaw Josey Wales.

After the Civil War, Fort Scott was a premier city of the frontier, one of the largest cities in eastern Kansas. On three occasions, between 1870 and 1900, Fort Scott was in competition with Kansas City to become the largest railroad center west of the Mississippi. During the first half of the 20th century, Fort Scott became an agricultural and small industrial center which it continues to be today.

Downtown fire

On March 11, 2005, a fire destroyed several historic buildings in Fort Scott's downtown. The Victorian-era buildings were among many that are a symbol of the town.

Geography
Fort Scott is located at  (37.835180, −94.702015) at an elevation of 846 feet (258 m). It lies on the Osage Plains on the south side of the Marmaton River.

Climate
Fort Scott has a humid subtropical climate (Köppen Cfa) with hot, humid summers and cool winters. On average, Fort Scott experiences 83.3 days of precipitation a year. Annual snowfall averages . On average, January is the coolest month, July the hottest and June the wettest.

Demographics

2010 census
As of the census of 2010, there were 8,087 people, 3,285 households, and 1,941 families living in the city. The racial makeup of the city was 90.3% White, 4.7% African American, 0.8% Native American, 0.6% Asian, 0.1% Pacific Islander, 0.7% from other races, and 2.9% from two or more races. Hispanic or Latino of any race were 2.5% of the population.

There were 3,285 households, of which 31.5% had children under the age of 18 living with them, 40.8% were married couples living together, 13.6% had a female householder with no husband present, 4.7% had a male householder with no wife present, and 40.9% were non-families. 34.9% of all households were made up of individuals, and 17.1% had someone living alone who was 65 years of age or older. The average household size was 2.34 and the average family size was 3.02.

The median age in the city was 35.2 years. 25.5% of residents were under the age of 18; 12.3% were between the ages of 18 and 24; 21.6% were from 25 to 44; 22.5% were from 45 to 64; and 18.1% were 65 years of age or older. The gender makeup of the city was 47.7% male and 52.3% female.

2000 census
As of the census of 2000, there were 8,297 people, 3,481 households, and 2,081 families living in the city. There were 3,914 housing units at an average density of 278.3 persons/km2 (721.5 persons/sq mi). The racial makeup of the city was 91.53% White, 5.15% African American, 0.93% Native American, 0.53% Asian, 0.06% Pacific Islander, 0.40% from other races, and 1.41% from two or more races. 1.68% of the population were Hispanic or Latino of any race.

There were 3,481 households, out of which 28.1% had children under the age of 18 living with them, 44.6% were married couples living together, 11.5% have a woman whose husband does not live with her, and 40.2% were non-families. 35.2% of all households were made up of individuals, and 18.7% had someone living alone who was 65 years of age or older. The average household size was 2.30 and the average family size was 2.97.

In the city, the population was spread out, with 24.9% under the age of 18, 11.3% from 18 to 24, 23.7% from 25 to 44, 19.0% from 45 to 64, and 21.2% who were 65 years of age or older. The median age was 37 years. For every 100 females, there were 85.8 males. For every 100 females age 18 and over, there were 80.2 males.

The median income for a household in the city was $26,871, and the median income for a family was $34,531. Males had a median income of $25,919 versus $20,583 for females. The per capita income for the city was $14,997.  About 10.9% of families and 16.3% of the population were below the poverty line, including 22.3% of those under age 18 and 12.9% of those age 65 or over.

Education

Colleges
Fort Scott Community College, founded in 1919, is the oldest community college in the state of Kansas.

Primary and secondary
The community is served by Fort Scott USD 234 public school district, which includes two public elementary schools (Eugene Ware Elementary and Winfield Scott Elementary), one public middle school (Fort Scott Middle School) and one high school (Fort Scott High School).

There is a Catholic school for grades K–5, Fort Scott Christian Heights for K–12 and a few other small private schools for students from grades K–12. There is also a public preschool in the old middle school building.

Points of interest

Gunn Park 

Gunn Park is a 155 acre park that has seven shelter houses, two lakes for fishing and multiple playground areas. There are 14 camping sites available with electricity and water.  In 1999, a nine hole Frisbee golf course was added through a joint effort of the City of Fort Scott and the Kiwanis Club of Fort Scott. The Disc Golf Course was later expanded to 18 holes. There are two fishing lakes available at Gunn Park. From October 15th to April 15th, Fern Lake is stocked with trout.  There are several playground areas located throughout the park with updated equipment. Approximately, 6.5 miles of single track, mountain bike trails have been added in the timber, and along the Marmaton River. These trails provide adventure and exercise for mountain bike riders, trail runners as well as hikers. Gunn Park has 7 shelter houses, 4 are enclosed shelters and 3 are open shelters. Shelters can be reserved at City Hall.

The first shelter house of stone was built in 1910 on the first lake (Fern Lake). There was a large wood theater building on the other side of Fern Lake with a seating capacity of 800. During special events such as July 4th, the street cars would take as many as 10,000 people to the park in one day.

In 1999, a nine hole Frisbee golf course was added to Gunn Park through a joint effort of the City of Fort Scott and the Kiwanis Club of Fort Scott. It was recently made an 18 hole course.

Media
 Fort Scott Tribune, daily newspaper, founded in 1884.
 KOMB 103.9 FM – Fort Scott Broadcasting. Classic and contemporary hits station, with talk shows throughout the week. Airs Kansas Jayhawks, Kansas City Chiefs, Kansas City Royals, Fort Scott Greyhounds and Fort Scott High School sports. 
 KMDO 1600 AM

Notable people

 Richard Christy – drummer, personality on The Howard Stern Show
 Clark M. Clifford – former United States Secretary of Defense
 Jerry Elliott – jurist
 Charles Hatfield – "rain maker"
 Mark Hart – musician, songwriter, producer
 William D. Hawkins – U.S. Marine awarded the Medal of Honor posthumously during World War II
 Adam LaRoche – retired Major League Baseball first baseman
 Andy LaRoche – former major league third baseman for the Pittsburgh Pirates.
 David Perley Lowe – Kansas judge
 Bob Marshall — Kansas state senator
 Elmer Verner McCollum – biochemist, discoverer of vitamin A
 William McDonald – first Governor of the State of New Mexico; resident of Fort Scott.
 Gordon Parks – photographer, author, filmmaker, and composer
 Lon Ury – baseball player

References

Further reading

External links

 
 Fort Scott - Directory of Public Officials
 Fort Scott Chamber of Commerce
 Fort Scott National Cemetery photo tour
 Fort Scott city map, KDOT

Cities in Kansas
County seats in Kansas
Cities in Bourbon County, Kansas
1842 establishments in the United States
Populated places established in 1842
Military installations established in 1842
Military installations closed in 1853